Coleophora bivittella is a moth of the family Coleophoridae. It is found in Asia Minor and Iran.

References

bivittella
Moths described in 1879
Moths of Asia